Adam Bargielski (January 7, 1903 – September 8, 1942) was a Polish Roman Catholic priest and the vicar of the Myszyńcu parish. He was born in Kalinowo, Łomża County. He died in the Nazi German Dachau concentration camp. He was beatified by Pope John Paul II and is a member of the 108 Martyrs of World War II.

See also 
List of Nazi-German concentration camps
The Holocaust in Poland
World War II casualties of Poland

References

1903 births
1942 deaths
20th-century Polish Roman Catholic priests
People from Łomża County
108 Blessed Polish Martyrs
Polish people who died in Dachau concentration camp